KCYS (96.5 FM) is a radio station licensed to serve Seaside, Oregon, United States. The station is owned by Jeff Huffman, through licensee Jacobs Radio Programming, LLC. KCYS broadcasts a country music format.

The state of Oregon has designated KCYS as the primary, also called "P-1", provider to Clatsop County of bulletins about weather and other emergencies issued by state agencies and officials.

History
This station received its original construction permit from the Federal Communications Commission on September 5, 1996.  The new station was assigned the KCYS call sign by the FCC on November 25, 1996.  KCYS received its license to cover from the FCC on April 1, 1998.

References

External links

CYS
Country radio stations in the United States
Radio stations established in 1997
Seaside, Oregon
1997 establishments in Oregon